Don't Stop is the third solo album by Jeffrey Osborne, released on September 21, 1984.

Reception

The album reached #39 on the Billboard 200 albums chart and #7 on the R&B album chart. The title song as well as the two other singles, "The Borderlines" and "Let Me Know", all reached #6, #7, and #44 on the R&B Singles Chart.

Track listing
"Don't Stop" (David Batteau, Danny Sembello) - 4:09
"Let Me Know" (Geoffrey Brillhart Leib, Jeffrey Osborne) - 5:26
"The Borderlines" (Raymond Jones) - 5:27
"The Power" (Don Freeman, Warren Giancaterino, Jeffrey Osborne) - 4:51
"Is It Right" (Jeffrey Osborne, David Wolinski) - 4:46
"You Can't Be Serious" (Don Freeman, Jeffrey Osborne) - 4:37
"Crazy 'Bout Cha" (Don Freeman, Jeffrey Osborne) - 3:31 
"Hot Coals" (Don Freeman, Jeffrey Osborne) - 3:27
"Live for Today" (David Batteau, Don Freeman, Jeffrey Osborne) - 4:26

Personnel 
Performers and Musicians

 Jeffrey Osborne – lead vocals, backing vocals (1-7), E-mu Emulator (3), drum machine programming (4, 9)
 George Duke – Polymoog (1), Prophet 5 (1, 5, 6, 7), acoustic piano (2), Memorymoog (2, 7), Yamaha PF10 (2), synth solo (2, 6), E-mu Emulator (3), Moog bass (6), Yamaha DX7 (7), Rhodes (7)
 Danny Sembello – Yamaha DX7 (1), Roland Jupiter 8 (1)
 Raymond Jones – Yamaha DX7 (3), Roland Jupiter 8 (3), Fairlight CMI (3)
 Gary Chang – synthesizer programming (3, 8)
 Derek Nakamoto – synthesizer programming (4, 6), special effects (4, 6), Fairlight programming (6)
 Don Freeman – Yamaha DX7 (4, 6, 8), Roland Juno-60 (4), Fairlight CMI (6), drum machine programming (6, 8, 9), Roland Jupiter 8 (8), PPG Wave 2.2 (8), acoustic piano (9), Rhodes (9)
 David Wolinski – Yamaha DX7 (5), Roland Jupiter 8 (5), Minimoog (5), Rhodes (5), drum machine programming (5)
 John Barnes – Fairlight CMI (9)
 Michael Sembello – guitar (1)
 Paul Jackson Jr. – guitar (2, 3, 4, 6-9)
 Charles Fearing – guitar (5)
 Louis Johnson – bass (1, 8, 9)
 Freddie Washington – bass (2, 5, 6, 7)
 Abraham Laboriel – bass (9)
 Steve Ferrone – drums (1, 2, 7), hi-hat (9)
 Paulinho da Costa – percussion (2, 3, 4, 8, 9), cowbell (6), tambourine (6)
 George Del Barrio – string arrangements (2, 7)
 Catherine Gotthoffer – harp (2, 7)
 Ron Cooper, Ray Kelley, Earl Madison and Fred Seykora – cello (2, 7)
 Rollice Dale, Pam Goldsmith, Allan Harshman and Dave Schwartz – viola (2, 7)
 Arnold Belnick, Assa Drori, Henry Ferber, Ron Folsom, Dave Frisina, Jimmy Getzoff, Reg Hill, Karen Jones, Joy Lyle, Irma Neumann, Stan Plummer and Sid Sharp – violin (2, 7)
 Syreeta Wright – backing vocals (1)
 Portia Griffin – backing vocals (2, 7)
 Lynn Davis – backing vocals (4, 6)
 Tremaine Hawkins – backing vocals (5)
 Pat Benatar, Lynn Davis,  Tremaine Hawkins, Howard Hewett, James Ingram, Joyce Kennedy, Debra Laws, Kenny Loggins and Jeffrey Osborne – choir (9)

Production and Technical

 Producer – George Duke
 Production Assistance – Constance DeGuzman
 Engineer and Remix – Tommy Vicari
 Assistant Engineers – Ray Blair, Frank Dookun, Bino Espinoza, Mark Ettel, Steve Evans, Mitch Gibson, Danny Kopelson, Dave Luke, Sharon Rice, Nick Spigel and Erik Zobler.
 Mastered by Brian Gardner at Bernie Grundman Mastering (Hollywood, CA).
 Art Direction – Chuck Beeson
 Design – Chuck Beeson and John Heiden
 Photography – Matthew Rolston
 Stylist – Cecille Parker
 Management –  Jack Nelson & Associates
 Recorded at Ocean Way Recording, The Complex and Foot On The Hill Studio (Los Angeles, CA); Le Gonks West and Soundcastle (Hollywood, CA); Fantasy Studios (Berkeley, CA).

Charts

Weekly charts

Year-end charts

Singles

In popular culture
Eden Capwell and Cruz Castillo danced to "The Borderlines" in a 1985 Santa Barbara episode where Osborne made a guest appearance as himself.

References

1984 albums
Jeffrey Osborne albums
A&M Records albums
Albums produced by George Duke